Health education is a profession of educating people about health. Areas within this profession encompass environmental health, physical health, social health, emotional health, intellectual health, and spiritual health, as well as sexual and reproductive health education.

Health education can be defined as the principle by which individuals and groups of people learn to behave in a manner conducive to the promotion, maintenance, or restoration of health. However, as there are multiple definitions of health, there are also multiple definitions of health education.  In the U.S., the Joint Committee on Health Education and Promotion Terminology of 2001 defined Health Education as "any combination of planned learning experiences based on sound theories that provide individuals, groups, and communities the opportunity to acquire information and the skills needed to make quality health decisions."

The World Health Organization (WHO) defined Health Education as consisting of "consciously constructed opportunities for learning involving some form of communication designed to improve health literacy, including improving knowledge, and developing life skills which are conducive to individual and community health."

History

It is often thought that health education began with the beginning of healthcare in the earliest parts of history as knowledge was passed from generation to generation. Preserved texts from ancient civilizations in China, India, Egypt, Greece, Rome, Persia and others contain information regarding various diseases, their treatments, and even preventative measures. The first medical school was later founded at the end of the 8th century in Salerno, Italy and focused a significant portion of its curriculum on proper hygiene and healthy lifestyles. Much later, Johann Guttenberg's printing press paved the way for making educational materials more accessible as some of the first things to be printed were treatises regarding health. Informational materials containing information about hygiene and healthy lifestyle choices became popular as a tool to combat epidemics. In the 19th century, "awareness-rising" began to increase to improve the knowledge of the average people regarding health and other topics. As medicine has continued to progress, with new fields being created to address new problems, so too has methods of providing health education.

Prior to the 1960s, the physician was primarily in charge and the patients were expected to have a passive role in their own health decisions. In 1976, the Patient Education and Counseling journal was founded and the concept of health education began to really take off. It was around this time that it became apparent that if patients are informed about their health, they could improve it through various lifestyle changes. In the 1980s, patient advocacy groups drew attention to the issue of patients' rights such as the right to be informed about health conditions and the potential options for care. The 1990s fully brought about the shared decision making model present in healthcare settings today, including the emergence of electronic health communication. Lastly, in the 21st century, there has been an emergence of associations designated as platforms for promoting health education and communication.

In the United States specifically...

The purpose and approach of health education in the United States have evolved over time. From the late nineteenth to the mid-twentieth century, the aim of public health was controlling the harm from infectious diseases, which were largely under control by the 1950s. The major recent trend regarding changing definitions of school health education is the increasing acknowledgement that school education influences adult behavior.

In the 1970s, health education was viewed in the U.S. mostly as a means of communicating healthy medical practices to those who should be practicing them. By this time, it was clear that reducing illness, death, and rising health care costs could best be achieved through a focus on health promotion and disease prevention. At the heart of the new approach was the role of a health educator.

In the 1980s definitions began to incorporate the belief that education is a means of empowerment for the individual, allowing them to make educated health decisions. Health education in the U.S. became "the process of assisting individuals… to make informed decisions about matters affecting their personal health and the health of others." This definition emerged in the same year as the first national-scale investigation of health education in schools in the United States, which eventually led to a much more aggressive approach to educating young people on matters of health. In the late 1990s the World Health Organization launched a Global Health Initiative which aimed at developing "health-promoting schools", which would enhance school health programs at all levels including: local, regional, national, and global level.

Today school health education is seen in the U.S. as a "comprehensive health curricula", combining community, schools, and patient care practice, in which "Health education covers the continuum from disease prevention and promotion of optimal health to the detection of illness to treatment, rehabilitation, and long-term care." This concept is recently prescribed in current scientific literature as ‘health promotion’, a phrase that is used interchangeably with health education, although health promotion is broader in focus.

Role of the Health Education Specialist

A health educator is "a professionally prepared individual who serves in a variety of roles and is specifically trained to use appropriate educational strategies and methods to facilitate the development of policies, procedures, interventions, and systems conducive to the health of individuals, groups, and communities" (Joint Committee on Terminology, 2001, p. 100).  In other words, they conduct, evaluate, and design activities that pertain to the improvement of the health and well-being of humans. Examples of this include "patient educators, health education teachers, trainers, community organizers, and health program managers." There is a variation in job titles and because of this, there is not a definite system of one health education system. In January 1978 the Role Delineation Project was put into place, in order to define the basic roles and responsibilities for the health educator. The result was a Framework for the Development of Competency-Based Curricula for Entry Level Health Educators (NCHEC, 1985). A second result was a revised version of A Competency-Based Framework for the Professional Development of Certified Health Education Specialists (NCHEC, 1996). These documents outlined the seven areas of responsibilities which are shown below. The Health Education Specialist Practice Analysis (HESPA II 2020) produced "a new hierarchical model with 8 Areas of Responsibility, 35 Competencies, and 193 Sub-competencies".

Peer Health Educators 
Peer health education is described as student’s taking initiative to inform their peers on how to live healthy lifestyles. Prevention is the biggest aspect of this idea and often includes alcohol, sexual health, and emotional wellbeing education in addition to many other aspects. Sloane and Zimmer also describe peer health education as “motivational models designed to empower students to help each other promote positive health beliefs and behaviors” Health education specialists often advise peer educators as well; this creates relationships with health professionals while providing relevant resources and models necessary to educate the most students possible. 

The most research on peer educators has been done within colleges and universities within Western-civilizations. However, a specific example of peer health education being utilized is seen within The Shantou Experience in China.  In this experience, medical students were selected to educate their peers on topics from diet and safer sex to mental and physical health. Self-administered questionnaires were used to track results from the participants as well as from the peer health educators. According to the questionnaire results, “All peer educators responded positively and the majority of students respondents positively evaluated. Although some students preferred to seek health information online, approximately one-quarter of the student respondents  would contact peer educators”.   Ultimately, peer education has a greater acceptance in Western-societies and would require “cultural adaptation for greater effectiveness in China” and other Eastern-societies.

Teaching School Health Education

In the United States, around forty states require the teaching of health education. A comprehensive health education curriculum consists of planned learning experiences that will help students achieve desirable attitudes and practices related to critical health issues. Studies have shown that students are able to identify how emotions and healthy eating habits can possibly impact each other. Some of these are: emotional health and a positive self-image; appreciation, respect for, and care of the human body and its vital organs; physical fitness; health issues of alcohol, tobacco, drug use, and substance use disorders; health misconceptions and myths; effects of exercise on the body systems and on general well being; nutrition and weight control; sexual relationships and sexuality, the scientific, social, and economic aspects of community and ecological health; communicable and degenerative diseases including sexually transmitted diseases; disaster preparedness; safety and driver education; factors in the environment and how those factors affect an individual's or population's environmental health (ex: air quality, water quality, food sanitation); life skills; choosing professional medical and health services; and choices of health careers.

Mental Health
The topic of mental health has been getting more awareness and is becoming a more socially acceptable concept. However the average individual’s mental health literacy, one’s ability to “...recognize, manage, and prevent mental disorders”, is not acceptable. Having a well-developed MHL will allow for students to not only manage their own mental health but help support others too. In Seedaket et als systematic review, they concluded that both school-based and community-based interventions can be successful in improving MHL. 

Teaching children about mental health in school can help them see mental health as a normal occurrence and not something that should be ignored. In recent times we have seen an effort of increasing this way of teaching in health programs. The issue now is that “...teachers have limited skills to manage complex mental health difficulties”. Mental health and MHL are complex ideas. Teachers do not have that kind of medical training to teach students everything that they need to know. To help the educators attain the ability to teach mental health topics as well as help their confidence in their ability to teach these topics, more specific training should be done. 

Students can be taught about mental health with community-based interventions as well. This allows for experts to be brought in and teach youth about the signs of a mental illness and the ways to help manage them. This information can help increase an individual’s MHL and help them in their future. Parents should also be informing their children about these topics. Having open discussions about mental health will create an environment where the child feels comfortable talking about this topic with their guardians. They should also be supportive and willing to listen to any problems their kids have.

School National Health Education Standards

The National Health Education Standards (NHES) are written expectations for what the students should know and be able to do by grades 2, 5, 8, and 12 to promote personal, family, and community health. The standards provide a framework for curriculum development and selection, instruction, and student assessment in health education.  The performance indicators articulate specifically what students should know or be able to do in support of each standard by the conclusion of each of the following grade spans: Pre-K–Grade 12. The performance indicators serve as a blueprint for organizing student assessment.

Health Education Code of Ethics
The Health Education Code of Ethics has been a work in progress since approximately 1976, begun by the Society for Public Health Education (SOPHE).

"The Code of Ethics that has evolved from this long and arduous process is not seen as a completed project. Rather, it is envisioned as a living document that will continue to evolve as the practice of Health Education changes to meet the challenges of the new millennium."

School Health Education Worldwide

Romania
Since 2001, the Ministry of Education, Research, Youth, and Sports developed a national curriculum on Health Education. The National Health Education Programme in Romanian Schools was considered a priority for the intervention of the GFATM (Global Fund) and UN Agencies. 

For the development of students’ acquirement of practical skills and knowledge to have a new specialization in Nutrition and Dietetics, the study program was initiated in the University of Medicine and Pharmacy (UMF) of Iuliu Hațieganu in 2008. Other universities continued to have the authority of this study including the University of Medicine, Pharmacy, Science, and Technology (UMFST) of Târgu Mureş, Iaşi, and Timişoara. The 104 students from these universities also participated in “Nutrition Medicine of the Future,” the first National Symposium of Nutrition and Dietetics on 6-7 May, 2011 to give and hear lectures. The second edition of this Symposium invited more International participants, such as the International Federation of Dietitians with the attendance of more than 150 students and other professionals.

Japan

Yogo Teachers 
School nurses in Japan are called yogo teachers also known as hoken kyoushi (Kanji: 保健教師). Yogo teachers take a part of the educational staff to support students growth through the health education and services which are under school educational activities.Yogo teachers are trained to take care of student's physical health and their mental health. Through their observations of student's actions, the yogo teachers are able to identify students early-stage mood disorders and help support them as a school education. The problems causing mood disorders may include, family history, physical illness, previous diagnosis, and trauma. As many students have traumas, yogo teachers are able to detect physical or mental abuse cases (which could be a cause of trauma) more than other teachers. Therefore, yogo teachers are expected to take quick actions during the students early stages of mood disorder or child abuse as soon as possible.

Nutrition 
Shokuiku (Kanji: 食育) is the Japanese term for "food education". The law defines it as the "acquisition of knowledge about food and nutrition, as well as the ability to make appropriate decisions through practical experience with food, with the aim of developing people's ability to live on a healthy diet".

It was initiated by Sagen Ishizuka, a famous military doctor and pioneer of the macrobiotic diet. Following the introduction of Western fast food in the late 20th century, the Japanese government mandated education in nutrition and food origins, starting with the Basic Law of Shokuiku in 2005, and followed with the School Health Law in 2008. Universities have established programs to teach shokuiku in public schools, as well as investigating its effectiveness through academic study.

Major concerns that led to the development of shokuiku law include:
 School children skipping breakfast.
 Children purchasing meals at a convenience store instead of eating with their parents.
 Families not eating meals together.

Classes in shokuiku will study the processes of making food, such as farming or fermentation; how additives create flavor; and where food comes from.

Poland 
Health education in Poland is not mandatory. However, research has shown that even with implantation of health education that the adolescents of Poland were still not choosing to live a healthy lifestyle. Health education is still needed in Poland, but the factor of what is actually available, especially in rural areas, and what is affordable affects the decisions more than what is healthy. 

Although Polish schools curricula include health education, it is not a separate subject but concluded in other subjects such as nature, biology, and physical education. Some measurements have been taken to address this issue by non-government organizations.

Taiwan 

Health education in Taiwan focuses on multiple topics, including:
 Education for student to enhance their health status.
 Assists parents to use health resources and health education information.
 Teach students to understand specific diseases and basic medical knowledge.

Ireland 
 
One school in Ireland has been teaching health education since 2004. The children are able to learn about their physical health, for instance, the students were able to go on a school walk, learn traditional Irish dancing, and learn how to swim. However, not all their activities are based on physical health. The kids also learn about healthy eating. One activity involves a food pyramid. Here students will learn about different foods and how they affect our health. At the bottom of the food pyramid are fruits and veggies like apples and carrots and at the top of the pyramid are fried foods like fries. The pyramid is wooden and has different colors corresponding to the level of the pyramid. Green corresponds with the lowest level of the pyramid and so on. The foods on the pyramid are 3D toys so the kids can see what the food looks like.

United Kingdom 

The UK had implemented health education in their school system since the early 2000s. According to Gov.UK “... all pupils will study compulsory health education as well as new reformed relationships education in primary school and relationships and sex education in secondary school (Gov.UK, 2018)”. However, these are not the only things being learned. The UK school system also teaches their students about mental health, leading a healthy lifestyle, and education about obesity.

Health Education and Sustainable Development Goals 
Health Education is crucial in working towards achieving Sustainable Development Goals (SDG) created by the United Nations (UN). The UN created these goals in the hope that there will be motivation in following “a shared blueprint for peace and prosperity for people and the planet, now and into the future.” By increasing Health Education implementation, it contributes to bringing awareness and learning to individuals, creating an understanding of the significance of international health and well-being.

See also
 Dorothy Nyswander
 Health promotion
 Online health communities
 Personal, Social and Health Education
 Physical Education
 Public Health
 School Health Education Study
 Health skills

References

N/A, N., 2018. New relationships and health education in schools. [online] GOV.UK. Available at: <https://www.gov.uk/government/news/new-relationships-and-health-education-in-schools> [Accessed 23 July 2022].

N/A, N., 2019. Health Promoting School,Health Promoting School Mallow, school health. [online] Glantane National School. Available at: <https://glantanens.ie/health-promoting-school/> [Accessed 23 July 2022].

Books
 Centers for Disease Control & Prevention. (2007). National Health Education Standards. Retrieved May 1, 2009, from Characteristics of Effective Health Education Curricula - SHER | Healthy Schools | CDC
 Coalition of National Health Education Organizations. Health Education Code of Ethics. November 8, 1999, Chicago, IL.  Retrieved May 1, 2009, from CNHEO
 Joint Committee on Terminology. (2001). Report of the 2000 Joint Committee on Health Education and Promotion Terminology. American Journal of Health Education.
 McKenzie, J., Neiger, B., Thackeray, R.  (2009). Planning, Implementing, & Evaluating Health Promotion Programs. 5th edition. San Francisco, CA: Pearson Education, Inc.
 Simons-Morton, B. G., Greene, W. H., & Gottlieb, N. H.. (2005). Introduction to Health Education and Health Promotion. 2nd edition. Waveland Press.
 World Health Organization. (1998). Health Promotion Glossary. Retrieved May 1, 2009, from Wayback Machine.

External links

 Centers for Disease Control and Prevention (USA)
 US Department of Health & Human Services (USA)
 National Institutes of Health (USA)
 World Health Organization (USA)
 

 
Health promotion
Public health